Jalia is a small village in the Amreli District of Gujarat, India.

Nearby attractions are Bhurakhiya Hanuman Mandir and Khodiyar Mandir. In Jalia there are two Banks First one is State Bank of India and Second one is Amreli District Central Co-operative Bank. Primary health centre, School and Highschool is there since long. The nearest access points are Amreli Airport and Amreli Railway Station.

Most of the villagers belong from Patel community [Nakrani].

References

Villages in Amreli district